Jo Koo Cho-lam (谷祖琳; born 16 May 1977), sometimes credited as Jo Koo is a Hong Kong actress and singer.

Personal life
In 2010, Koo married businessman Andrew Lau Wing-hang (劉穎恆), whom she met while studying in Australia. The couple have one daughter, born in 2012, and announced in July 2014 that Kuk was pregnant again. Outside of her acting career, Kuk also runs a chain of dessert shops.

Filmography

TV series

References

External links
 
 
 Jo Kuk at the Hong Kong Cinemagic
 Jo Koo at Instagram

20th-century Hong Kong actresses
1977 births
Living people
21st-century Hong Kong actresses
Hong Kong film actresses
Hong Kong television actresses